The Museum of the History of Catalonia (MHC) is a history museum in Barcelona that promotes the awareness and knowledge of the history of Catalonia and its culture. The museum is located in Barcelona's Palau de Mar, the former General Stores (Magatzems Generals de Comerç), the sole building of Barcelona's old industrial port still standing.

Exhibitions 

The permanent exhibition "The memory of a country" consists of a journey through the history of Catalonia from prehistoric to modern times, documenting the main events, cultures and historic personalities that made up the history of Catalonia. It is divided on 8 historical periods. Temporary exhibitions include: "Fashion and fashion designers" (until 13 October 2019) and "Beyond the trenches (1936-1939). Photographies by Alec Wainman" (until 3 November 2019).

The museum website offers free of charge online audio guides for the exhibitions in different languages: Catalan, Spanish, English and French.

Management 

It is controlled and funded by the Government of Catalonia through the Ministry of Culture. It is one of the 11 museums that are a member of the Network of History Museums and Monuments of Catalonia Network (XMHCat). Since 1997, the museum building also holds the Center for Contemporary History of Catalonia and its library, which is administered by the Ministry of the Presidency.

Directors 
 Carme Laura Gil i Miró (1996)
 Josep Maria Solé i Sabaté (1996-2000)
 Jaume Sobrequés i Callicó (2000-2008)
 Agustí Alcoberro i Pericay (2008-2014)
 Jusèp Boya i Busquet (2014-2016)
 Margarida Sala i Albareda (2016-present)

References

External links 

 

History of Catalonia
History museums in Catalonia
Museums in Barcelona
Museums established in 1996